The women's flyweight boxing competition at the 2016 Olympic Games in Rio de Janeiro was held from 12 to 20 August at the Riocentro.

Schedule 
All times are Brasília Time (UTC−3).

Results

References

Boxing at the 2016 Summer Olympics
Women's events at the 2016 Summer Olympics
2016 in women's boxing